Hürup is an Amt ("collective municipality") in the district of Schleswig-Flensburg, in Schleswig-Holstein, Germany. The seat of the Amt is in Hürup.

The Amt Hürup consists of the following municipalities:

Ausacker (561) 
Freienwill (1,479) 
Großsolt (1,909) 
Hürup (1,176) 
Husby (2,200) 
Maasbüll (746) 
Tastrup (442)

References

Ämter in Schleswig-Holstein